Trenton Lawson "Trent" Lehman (February 23, 1961 – January 18, 1982) was an American child actor.

Early life and career

Lehman, who was raised in the Los Angeles suburb of Arleta, was best known for his role as impish middle child Bentley "Butch" Everett on the 70's sitcom Nanny and the Professor.  Prior to landing his most famous role, he also played a young Christine Jorgensen in The Christine Jorgensen Story, and appeared in episodes of Gunsmoke and Emergency!.

Lehman's last credited role was in 1973. Twelve years old, he was having difficulty finding work, which led to bouts of depression.  His mother moved his family to Colorado later in the decade, but Lehman decided to return to California, resettling in an apartment in North Hollywood.

Death
Days before Lehman died, he reconnected with Joseph Allen, a classmate of his from Vena Avenue Elementary School.  Allen told police that Lehman had asked him for a gun as he had become despondent over breaking up with his girlfriend and a recent burglary of his apartment.  Police had no knowledge of the burglary until after Lehman's death.  

On January 18, 1982, Lehman died after he hanged himself on a chain link fence outside of Vena Avenue Elementary School in Pacoima, California. He had attended the school before being withdrawn to become an actor. 

Lehman's death, along with those of two other former child actors, Rusty Hamer and Tim Hovey, inspired Paul Petersen to found A Minor Consideration, an advocacy group for child stars.

Filmography

References

External links 
 

1961 births
1982 deaths
20th-century American male actors
Male actors from Los Angeles
American male child actors
American male film actors
American male television actors
American male voice actors
Suicides by hanging in California
1982 suicides